Wetton is a small suburb in Cape Town, South Africa, with a surface size of only 0,74 km². It is situated on the edge of the Southern Suburbs alongside the suburb of Lansdowne and Kenwyn.

References 

Suburbs of Cape Town